The copper woolly bat (Kerivoula cuprosa) is a species of vesper bat in the family Vespertilionidae.
It is found in Cameroon, Democratic Republic of the Congo, Ivory Coast, and Guinea.
Its natural habitats are subtropical or tropical dry forests, subtropical or tropical moist lowland forests, and subtropical or tropical swamps.
It is threatened by habitat loss.

Sources

Kerivoulinae
Taxa named by Oldfield Thomas
Mammals described in 1912
Bats of Africa
Taxonomy articles created by Polbot